A stereotypy is a repetitive behavior related to mental impairment.

Stereotypy may also refer to:
Stereotypy (non-human), repetitive non-functional behavior in animals
Stereotypy (printing), the making of duplicate typographical elements

See also
Stereotype (disambiguation)